Pier Road is a street in Luss, Argyll and Bute, Scotland. Located on Loch Lomond's western shore, the road, which is on an east–west alignment, consists of around twenty buildings, many of which are listed cottages dating from the 19th century.

The building closest to the Luss Pier, at the head of Pier Road, is a whitewashed cottage that is currently the home of Highland Art Studios.

The building housing Luss General Store is a Category C listed building dating to the early or mid-19th century.

Opposite the western end of the road is the Loch Lomond Arms Hotel (formerly the Colquhoun Arms Hotel). The property was purchased by Luss Estates in 2012.

Notable buildings and structures
Below is a selection of notable buildings and structures on both sides of Pier Road. Each section is ordered from east to west:

Northern side

|}

Southern side

|}

See also
List of listed buildings in Luss

Notes

References

External links
Luss – Gazetteer for Scotland
"Luss pier loch lomond" – sloany121, YouTube, 18 September 2019
"LUSS VILLAGE | Loch Lomond Scotland" – BambengVlogs UK, YouTube, 12 March 2021

Luss
Streets in Scotland
Transport in Argyll and Bute
Tourist attractions in Argyll and Bute